Edge of Darkness is a 2010 conspiracy action thriller film directed by Martin Campbell, written by William Monahan and Andrew Bovell, and starring Mel Gibson and Ray Winstone. A British-American co-production, it is based on the 1985 BBC television series of the same name, which was likewise directed by Campbell. This was Gibson's first screen lead since Signs (2002), and follows a detective investigating the murder of his activist daughter, while uncovering political conspiracies and cover-ups in the process.

The film was released on January 29, 2010. It received mixed reviews from critics, though Gibson's and Winstone's performances were praised, and grossed $81 million against its $80 million production budget.

Plot
At South Station, Boston, homicide detective Thomas Craven picks up his daughter Emma, who comes home to visit and vomits while getting into the car. As Craven prepares dinner at home, Emma suffers a nosebleed and vomits again. Thomas realizes he needs to take his daughter to the hospital. As they step outside the house, a masked gunman yells "Craven!" and fatally wounds Emma with a shotgun blast and escapes as Craven attends to his daughter, who dies in his arms.

At the medical examiner's office, Craven takes a lock of Emma's hair as a memento, then returns to duty to help find out who wanted to kill him. When he discovers that Emma had a .45 pistol in her night stand, he starts to suspect that Emma was the target. He checks the gun's ownership and finds out that it belongs to her boyfriend, David. David is living in fear of Northmoor, the company where he and Emma worked. David will not say more, but Craven incidentally discovers that the lock of Emma's hair is radioactive. Emma had discovered that Northmoor, a research and development facility under contract to the U.S. government and headed by Jack Bennett, was secretly manufacturing nuclear weapons using foreign material. The weapons were intended to be linked with foreign nations if they were used by the US as dirty bombs.

Burning Emma's clothing in his backyard, Craven suddenly draws his weapon and turns to find Jedburgh, a British "consultant", casually sitting in his backyard. Jedburgh was tasked with preventing the disclosure of the information Emma had and tying up any loose ends, including her father. Jedburgh takes a liking to Craven, leaving him to investigate. Craven repeatedly has visions of Emma's past, including short conversations, typically as the happy young child he remembers and loves. Craven eventually discovers through one of Emma's activist friends, who is nearly killed by a Northmoor agent, that Bennett ordered Emma's murder, as well as those of the other activists Emma was working with to expose Northmoor.

Craven confronts U.S. Senator Jim Pine who was contacted earlier by Emma, revealing that Craven knows almost everything that happened. After examining Emma's  fridge with a Geiger counter, Craven discovers that her milk is radioactive. His fellow detective and friend, Bill, comes to Craven's home while the Northmoor agents break into the house. Craven realizes that Bill set him up before the agents taser and kidnap Craven, taking him away in an ambulance. He wakes up handcuffed to a gurney in the Northmoor facility, but manages to escape.

His health deteriorating rapidly from radiation poisoning, presumably done to him before he was kidnapped, Craven heads to Bennett's house and kills the Northmoor agents after forcing one of them at gunpoint to shout "Craven," finally identifying him as Emma's killer. Bennett shoots and wounds Craven, but Craven also wounds Bennett and forces some of the radioactive milk down his throat. Bennett attempts to take some pills to counteract the radioactivity, only for Craven to tell Bennett he deserves what's coming to him and then to shoot Bennett dead.

Jedburgh, who is suffering from an unrelated terminal illness, meets with the Senator and two political advisers who had hired Jedburgh to handle Craven. They want to spin the Northmoor incident in a positive light. Jedburgh suggests that an assassination attempt on the Senator could be an angle to drive Bennett's death out of the headlines. They are pleased with this idea until Jedburgh abruptly kills both advisers and the senator. When a young police officer nervously enters the Senator's room, Jedburgh asks the officer at gunpoint if he has children. When the officer replies yes, Jedburgh lowers his gun, allowing the officer to shoot him dead.

While Craven lies dying in the hospital from his wounds and radiation poisoning, a young reporter for the local TV station WFXT, who had spoken to Craven a few nights earlier, opens a letter from him which contains DVDs recorded by Emma revealing the conspiracy, ensuring Northmoor's end. As Craven dies, the spirit of Emma comforts him. Craven and Emma are then shown leaving the hospital together, walking down the corridor and toward a bright, white light.

Cast
 Mel Gibson as Detective Thomas Craven, Boston Police Department. Gibson is a fan of the television series, and the film marks his first starring role since 2002's We Were Soldiers and Signs, following time spent focusing on directing (The Passion of the Christ, Apocalypto) and an involuntary hiatus following a controversial 2006 alcohol fueled incident. Gibson attended a gun club with two policemen to improve his marksmanship for the film.
 Ray Winstone as Darius Jedburgh, an ex-British Special Forces Captain turned private security operative sent to cover up the murder. Robert De Niro had been cast in the role, but he walked out shortly after he arrived to begin shooting. A publicist for the actor cited "creative differences."
 Danny Huston as Jack Bennett, Northmoor's shady head.
 Bojana Novakovic as Emma Craven, Tom's murdered daughter.
 Gabrielle Popa as Young Emma (credited as Maria Gabrielle Popa)
 Shawn Roberts as David Burnham, Emma's boyfriend.
 David Aaron Baker as Millroy
 Jay O. Sanders as Detective Bill Whitehouse, Tom's partner and close friend.
 Caterina Scorsone as Melissa, Emma's friend
 Gbenga Akinnagbe as Detective Darcy Jones, a detective in Tom's squad.
 Christy Scott Cashman as Detective Vicki Hurd
 Denis O'Hare as Moore
 Damian Young as Senator Jim Pine
 Peter Hermann as Sanderman
 Rick Avery as Allen C. Robinson Jr.
 Tom Kemp as Paul Honeywell
 Frank Grillo as Agent One, Emma's killer.
 Peter Epstein as Agent Two
 Wayne Duvall as Chief of Police
 Paul Sparks as Northampton Police Detective
 Frank L. Ridley as Automatic Weapons Cop.

Production 
In 2002, Martin Campbell announced that he was planning to adapt Edge of Darkness for the cinema. Active development began in early 2007 when Campbell met with producer Graham King, who first enlisted Australian playwright Andrew Bovell to write, and then William Monahan (fresh from winning an Academy Award for King's The Departed) to re-write the screenplay. Michael Wearing and BBC Films also co-produced the film. 

Filming began on 18 August 2008 in Boston, Massachusetts. A scene where Craven scatters his daughter's ashes at a beach was filmed at Rockport on 25 and 26 September. They shot some scenes in Merrimac, Massachusetts from 15 September 2008 to 18 September 2008. Additional scenes were shot in Malden, Massachusetts in the old Malden hospital. Some of the final scenes were shot at a home in Manchester-by-the-Sea, Massachusetts. Additionally, Gibson and his crew set up shop for filming in western Massachusetts, with 180 staff staying in Northampton hotels. They shot in various locations in the Pioneer Valley, including Tully O'Reilly's Pub, the Northampton Athletic Club, and an older part of the Hampshire County Courthouse, all in Northampton. Also, Sugarloaf Mountain was shut down for a few days while they rented it out.  They also filmed at the Notch Visitor Center, Rt. 116, Amherst, and right across the street from the Visitor Center, buried in Bare Mountain, The Notch Cold War Bunker stood in for the main entrance of the Northmoor facility. 

The film takes place in America, unlike the television series, which was based in England. "The idea was to transfer the story to a different time and place rather than just repeat what we did in England," Campbell said. "Boston seemed like the perfect location because it does have a whole English, Irish signature on it." Jack Bennett disembarks from a helicopter in one scene. The FAA registration number, N401LH, is visible on the fuselage. This helicopter later collided with a Piper PA-32 on 8 August 2009, over the Hudson River, resulting in nine deaths. The helicopter was owned by Liberty Helicopters, which offers sight-seeing tours around Manhattan. The film was originally scored by classical composer John Corigliano. However, the decision was made during postproduction (after Corigliano's score had been recorded and dubbed) to replace his score with a new one by Howard Shore.

Reception

Critical response
On Rotten Tomatoes, the film has an approval rating of 55% based on 217 reviews, with an average rating of 5.9/10. The website's critical consensus reads, "For better and for worse, Edge of Darkness offers vintage Mel Gibson, working within the familiar framework of a bloody revenge thriller." On Metacritic, the film has a weighted average score 55 out of 100, based on 34 critics, indicating "mixed or average reviews".  Audiences polled by CinemaScore gave the film an average grade of "B+" on an A+ to F scale.

Film critic Richard Roeper gave the film a grade of "B", stating: "Gibson excels in this entertaining conspiracy thriller". Michael Rechtshaffen of The Hollywood Reporter called the film "An intense Mel Gibson performance anchors this brutally effective crime thriller". Some critics, such as A.O. Scott of The New York Times, saw a similarity to Taken. Other critics, such as Chicago Sun-Times film critic Roger Ebert, Chicago Tribune film critic Michael Phillips, and New Orleans Times-Picayune film critic Mike Scott, described Ray Winstone's character in the film as "intriguing".

Box office
On its first weekend, the film opened number two, grossing $17.1 million behind Avatar. The film went on to gross $43.3 million in the United States and Canada and $37.8 million in other countries for a worldwide total of $81.1 million, against a production budget of $80 million.

Home media
The film was released by Warner Home Video on 11 May 2010, on DVD and Blu-ray.

References

External links
 
 
 
 

2010 films
2010 action drama films
2010 crime drama films
2010 crime thriller films
2010s political thriller films
2010 thriller drama films
American crime drama films
American crime thriller films
American political drama films
American political thriller films
American thriller drama films
Anti-nuclear films
BBC Film films
British drama films
2010s English-language films
Fictional portrayals of the Boston Police Department
Films about murder
American films about revenge
Films based on television series
Films directed by Martin Campbell
Films produced by Graham King
Films scored by Howard Shore
Films with screenplays by William Monahan
Films set in Boston
GK Films films
Icon Productions films
Warner Bros. films
2010s American films
2010s British films